Sidon is a town in Leflore County, Mississippi, United States. The population was 509 at the 2010 census. It is part of the Greenwood, Mississippi micropolitan area.

Geography
Sidon is located at  (33.408096, -90.208813).

Demographics

As of the 2010 United States Census, there were 509 people living in the town. The racial makeup of the town was 93.7% Black, 5.1% White, 0.2% Asian and 0.2% from two or more races. 0.8% were Hispanic or Latino of any race.

As of the census of 2000, there were 672 people, 215 households, and 158 families living in the town. The population density was 5,394.7 people per square mile (2,162.2/km). There were 220 housing units at an average density of 1,766.1 per square mile (707.9/km). The racial makeup of the town was 14.88% White, 83.33% African American, 0.89% Asian, and 0.89% from two or more races. Hispanic or Latino of any race were 0.60% of the population.

There were 215 households, out of which 45.1% had children under the age of 18 living with them, 32.6% were married couples living together, 35.3% had a female householder with no husband present, and 26.5% were non-families. 23.7% of all households were made up of individuals, and 7.0% had someone living alone who was 65 years of age or older. The average household size was 3.13 and the average family size was 3.75.

In the town, the population was spread out, with 41.4% under the age of 18, 11.3% from 18 to 24, 28.9% from 25 to 44, 11.0% from 45 to 64, and 7.4% who were 65 years of age or older. The median age was 23 years. For every 100 females, there were 83.6 males. For every 100 females age 18 and over, there were 68.4 males.

The median income for a household in the town was $15,435, and the median income for a family was $14,286. Males had a median income of $28,625 versus $17,083 for females. The per capita income for the town was $6,629. About 48.1% of families and 56.9% of the population were below the poverty line, including 75.3% of those under age 18 and 22.2% of those age 65 or over.

Education
It is in the Greenwood-Leflore School District. Residents are zoned to Amanda Elzy High School.

The town was formerly served by the Leflore County School District. Effective July 1, 2019 this district consolidated into the Greenwood-Leflore School District.

Notable people

 Edwards Barham, Louisiana state senator
 Edwin R. Holmes, federal judge
 Denise LaSalle, singer
 Viola B. Sanders, Assistant Chief of Naval Personnel for Women
 Frank E. Smith, U.S. congressman

Gallery

References

Towns in Leflore County, Mississippi
Towns in Mississippi
Greenwood, Mississippi micropolitan area